Christopher Patrick Reid (born 10 January 1996) is a South African swimmer. He competed in the men's 100 metre backstroke event at the 2016 Summer Olympics where he finished 10th in the semifinals and did not advance to the finals. He attended and competed for the University of Alabama. In the Autumn of 2019, he was member of the inaugural International Swimming League swimming for the New York Breakers, who competed in the Americas Division.

References

External links
 

1996 births
Living people
South African male swimmers
Olympic swimmers of South Africa
Swimmers at the 2016 Summer Olympics
Swimmers at the 2014 Summer Youth Olympics
Male backstroke swimmers